Monognathus boehlkei is a deep-sea eel inhabiting all oceans at depths up to 2,000 meters. Little is known of this species.

Description
The species is characterized by a distinctive high number of anal fin rays and a short, blunt head with a straight lower jaw. It is unpigmented or transparent, with five or six spots of pigment along the body. Individuals are sized at around 55-70 millimeters in length.

Distribution
Monognathus boehlkei is found mainly in the eastern and western Atlantic ocean.

References 

Monognathidae
Fish described in 1987